Ramsey House may refer to:

in the United States (by state then city)
Harris–Ramsey–Norris House, Quitman, Georgia, listed on the NRHP in Brooks County, Georgia 
Lewis Ramsey Jr. House, Lexington, Kentucky, listed on the NRHP in Fayette County, Kentucky
Ramsey House (Southville, Kentucky), listed on the NRHP in Shelby County, Kentucky 
Ramsey County Poor Farm Barn, St. Paul, Minnesota, listed on the NRHP in Ramsey County, Minnesota 
Alexander Ramsey House, St. Paul, Minnesota, house of Minnesota governor Alexander Ramsey
Justus Ramsey Stone House, St. Paul, Minnesota, listed on the NRHP in Ramsey County, Minnesota
Ramsey County Sheriff's House, Devils Lake, North Dakota, listed on the NRHP in Ramsey County, North Dakota
Ramsey House (Knox County, Tennessee), NRHP-listed, near Knoxville in Knox County, Tennessee
Crouch–Ramsey Family Farm, Summitville, Tennessee, listed on the National Register of Historic Places in Coffee County, Tennessee
F. T. and Belle Ramsey House, Austin, Texas, listed on the NRHP in Travis County, Texas
Lewis A. Ramsey House, Salt Lake City, Utah, listed on the NRHP in Salt Lake City, Utah 

in the United Kingdom
Ramsey House (Durham University), a building of St Chad's College, Durham

See also
Ramsay House (disambiguation)